Granzyme M is a protein that in humans is encoded by the GZMM gene.

Human natural killer (NK) cells and activated lymphocytes express and store a distinct subset of neutral serine proteases together with proteoglycans and other immune effector molecules in large cytoplasmic granules. These serine proteases are collectively termed granzymes and include 4 distinct gene products: granzyme A, granzyme B, granzyme H, and Met-ase, also known as granzyme M.

References

Further reading